Waskish is an unincorporated community in Waskish Township, Beltrami County, Minnesota, United States. Waskish has a post office with ZIP code 56685.

References

Unincorporated communities in Beltrami County, Minnesota
Unincorporated communities in Minnesota